Augustus "Gus" Parrish (born March 19, 1987) is a former American football offensive tackle. He was signed by the New Orleans Saints as an undrafted free agent in 2009. He played college football at Kent State University. He is now the head coach at Bowie High School (Maryland).

Professional career

New Orleans Saints
After going undrafted in the 2009 NFL Draft, Parrish was signed by the New Orleans Saints as an undrafted free agent on May 6. However, the team waived him on June 4.

Cincinnati Bengals
Parrish was signed by the Cincinnati Bengals on August 3, 2009. His attempt to make the Bengals' roster was chronicled on the HBO series Hard Knocks: Training Camp with the Cincinnati Bengals.

References

External links
Cincinnati Bengals bio
Kent State Golden Flashes bio

1987 births
Living people
People from Temple Hills, Maryland
Players of American football from Maryland
American football offensive tackles
Kent State Golden Flashes football players
New Orleans Saints players
Cincinnati Bengals players
Orlando Predators players